Federico Sacchi (born September 4, 1936 in Rosario) is a former Argentine football defender who played 15 times for the Argentina national team between 1960 and 1965. He is included in the Argentine Football Association Hall of Fame.

Club career

Sacchi started his career with Tiro Federal. In 1958 he was signed by Newell's Old Boys.

Sacchi joined  Racing Club de Avellaneda in 1961 and was part of the team that won the Argentine Primera in his first season with the club.

He joined Boca Juniors in 1965 and won another league title in his debut season with the club.

In 1967, he joined Sporting Cristal of Peru.

International career
Sacchi played 15 times for the Argentina national team, scoring one goal. He was a member of the Argentina squad for the 1962 World Cup.

Coaching career
After retiring as a player, Sacchi became a football coach, he worked as assistant to César Luis Menotti and managed several lower league teams in his own right, including Tigre and San Martín de Tucumán. He also worked as a youth team coach at Racing Club and Atlético de Rafaela.

Titles

External links
 AFA Hall of Fame entry

1936 births
Living people
Footballers from Rosario, Santa Fe
Argentine footballers
Association football defenders
Argentina international footballers
1962 FIFA World Cup players
Newell's Old Boys footballers
Racing Club de Avellaneda footballers
Boca Juniors footballers
Sporting Cristal footballers
Argentine Primera División players
Argentine expatriate footballers
Expatriate footballers in Peru
Argentine football managers
San Martín de Tucumán managers
Club Atlético Tigre managers